Amaranthus wrightii is a species of flowering plant. It goes by the common name of Wright's amaranth.

Description

The erect or ascending stems are tinged with white or red. The base of the leaves are acute, the leaf margins are entire, and the apex of the leaves are obtuse. The terminal and axillary inflorescences are short and thick, and reddish-green. The linear-lanceolate bracts are twice as long as the tepals. The staminate flowers also have five tepals and grow at the tips of inflorescences.

The plant flowers from summer into fall.

References

wrightii
Plants described in 1877
Taxa named by Sereno Watson
Flora of Texas